Charles G Bowen was a male athlete who competed for England.

Athletics career
He competed for England in the javelin at the 1934 British Empire Games in London and won the 1934 AAA Championships.

Personal life
He served as a lieutenant with the Lancashire Fusiliers.

References

English male javelin throwers
Athletes (track and field) at the 1934 British Empire Games
Commonwealth Games competitors for England